Victor Kim Ludwig Eriksson (born 17 September 2000) is a Swedish professional footballer who plays as a centre-back for Värnamo and the Sweden national team.

Club career
Eriksson is a youth product of Värnamo Södra FF and began his senior career with them at the age of 15 in the Swedish fifth division. He moved to Värnamo in 2017, and in 2019 he began his professional career with them in the third division. He helped the team win the 2020 Ettan, earning promotion to the Superettan. The following season, he helped Värnamo win the 2021 Superettan, earning the club a historic promotion into the Allsvenskan for the first time. In their debut season in the Allsvenskan in 2022, Eriksson played in all of their matches.

International career
Eriksson made his international debut with the senior Sweden national team in a friendly 2–0 win to Finland on 9 January 2023.

Career statistics

International

Honours
Värnamo
Ettan: 2020
Superettan: 2021

References

External links
 

2000 births
Living people
People from Värnamo Municipality
Swedish footballers
Sweden international footballers
IFK Värnamo players
Allsvenskan players
Superettan players
Ettan Fotboll players
Association football defenders